The men's decathlon event at the 2017 Asian Athletics Championships was held on 6 and 7 July.

Medalists

Results

100 metres
Wind: -0.8 m/s

Long jump

Shot put

High jump

400 metres

110 metres hurdles
Wind: +0.0 m/s

Discus throw

Pole vault

Javelin throw

1500 metres

Final standings

References

Decathlon
Combined events at the Asian Athletics Championships